Flamingo Land Stadium in Scarborough, North Yorkshire, England, is the home ground of Scarborough Athletic F.C.

Construction of the stadium started in 2016 with the final opening coming in 2017. The name is taken from the main sponsor of the site, Flamingo Land, which is off the A169 road between Malton and Pickering.

The first match to be played at the stadium was a friendly on 15 July 2017 versus a Sheffield United XI.

The stadium originally had a capacity 2,070 people, with 250 seats, but since the building of a new stand in summer 2019, the capacity has increased to 2,833 with 586 seats.

References 

Sport in Scarborough, North Yorkshire
Buildings and structures in Scarborough, North Yorkshire
Scarborough Athletic F.C.
Football venues in England
Sports venues in North Yorkshire